"Tomorrow Night" is a song and single written by Vincent Crane and performed by Atomic Rooster. Released in 1970 and taken from their 1970 album Death Walks Behind You, it reached 11 on the UK charts in 1971, staying there for 12 weeks. It was the first of the group's two UK chart hits. The song is described as "riff-laden" and "gutsy".

References 

1970 singles
1970 songs
Atomic Rooster songs
Songs written by Vincent Crane
British hard rock songs
Songs about nights